Pentti Raaskoski (born 3 March 1929) is a Finnish sprint canoer who competed in the late 1950s. At the 1956 Summer Olympics, he was disqualified in the heats of the K-2 1000 m event. He was born in Porvoo. Raaskoski spent his childhood in Porvoo. His father was a radio repairman and his mother a baroness. Raaskoski experienced the aerial bombardments of Porvoo during the Continuation War. He started working as a machine forger towards the end of the war and was called up for military service in 1949. In 1971, he moved to Sipoos for family reasons.

References 
Pentti Raaskoski's profile at Sports Reference.com

External links

1929 births
Possibly living people
People from Porvoo
Canoeists at the 1956 Summer Olympics
Finnish male canoeists
Olympic canoeists of Finland
Sportspeople from Uusimaa